Kevin Bolger (born April 11, 1993) is an American cross-country skier. He competed in the sprint at the 2022 Winter Olympics the first time four male American skiers have qualified. He competed collegiately for the University of Utah where he was named to the 2016 NCAA Skiing All-Americans Second Team.

Cross-country skiing results
All results are sourced from the International Ski Federation (FIS).

Olympic Games

Distance reduced to 30 km due to weather conditions.

World Championships

World Cup

Season standings

References

External links

1993 births
Living people
American male cross-country skiers
Tour de Ski skiers
Cross-country skiers at the 2022 Winter Olympics
Olympic cross-country skiers of the United States
People from Minocqua, Wisconsin
University of Utah alumni